The Mamberamo (Indonesian: Sungai Mamberamo) is the second longest river on the island of New Guinea, after Sepik River (1,146 km) and third largest in Oceania by discharge (5,500 m3/s) volume after Fly River (7,500 m3/s) and Sepik (7,000 m3/s). It is located in the Indonesian province of Papua. It is the second largest river in Indonesia by volume of discharge after Kapuas River (6,500 m3/s) and also the widest.

The river is formed from the confluence of its upper tributaries, the Tariku and Taritatu rivers in the Lakes Plains region, an interior basin with extensive freshwater swamp forests and grasslands. It flows northwards between the Van Rees Range (Pegunungan Van Rees) and Foja Mountains through a series of rapids and gorges. The last 160 km of the river are navigable. In the coastal lowlands the river is lined with marshes and forms a broad river delta. The Mamberamo discharges into the Pacific Ocean at the northern point of Point D'Urville or Cape Narwaku (Tanjung Narwaku).

The river's huge valley is home to various uncontacted peoples and incredible biodiversity. In the 1990s, the Indonesian Government had plans to construct a large hydroelectric dam on the Mamberamo that would have submerged much of the area. This plan was shelved after the Indonesian financial crisis from 1998–1999, but there are concerns by environmental groups that it could be resurrected sometime in the future. At present, the Mamberamo remains the second largest river in the world to be completely unfragmented by dams in its catchment, behind only the relatively nearby Fly.

The Mamberamo area also broadly refers to several nearby mountain ranges, including the Van Rees and Foja Mountains (also known as Foya), which were the subject of a recent rapid biological assessment conducted by Conservation International, the Indonesian Institute of Sciences, and Cenderawasih University. The scientific team discovered the first new bird species from New Guinea in 60 years, and a wealth of other new plants and animals. The Foya Mountains appear to be a globally outstanding repository of biodiversity.

Tributary

Mamberamo River List of Tributaries by length.

 Taritatu River 
 Tariku River

History

In 1545, the Spanish navigator Iñigo Ortiz de Retes sailed along the northern coast of the island as far as the mouth of this river that he charted as San Agustín. At this spot, on 20 June 1545, he claimed the territory for the Spanish Crown, and in the process bestowing the name to the island (Nueva Guinea) by which it is known today.

The first European to enter the mouth of the Mamberamo was Dutchman Dr D. F. van Braam Morris in 1883. The resident from the northern Moluccas (Ternate) rowed up the river to ascertain that it was navigable by steamer. The following year in 1884 Van Braam Morris returned in the steamship Havik and travelled  (as the crow flies) along its course.

Mamberamo Foja Wildlife Reserve

The Mamberamo Foja Wildlife Reserve covers an area of 16,610 km², extending along the Mamberamo and its major tributaries from the Central Range foothills to the Pacific Ocean. It encompasses the central Lakes Plains region, and extends southwards along the eastern side of the river to include the Foya Mountains, the river delta, and the sea.

Mamberamo Bridge
The Mamberamo Bridge was the second longest cable stayed span in Indonesia after Kutai Kartanegara Bridge with 235 meters and 270 meters respectively until the latter bridge collapsed in November 2011.

See also
Mekong-Mamberamo linguistic area
Lower Mamberamo languages
Kwerba Mamberamo language

References

External links

Rivers of Papua (province)
Rivers of Indonesia